Glenside Museum is situated within the Glenside Campus of the University of the West of England in Fishponds, Bristol, England.

The museum was founded by Dr Donal F. Early; a consultant psychiatrist at Glenside Hospital from the 1950s. He collected items of memorabilia and started a collection on the balcony of the dining hall of Glenside. When the building closed, the collection was re-located to the Glenside Chapel, and the collection slowly was built up to the museum it is today. The chapel was built in 1861 and is a grade II listed building. The museums collection consists of a wide range of paraphernalia and images from the life of Glenside Hospital (previously known as the Bristol Lunatic Asylum, Beaufort War Hospital in World War I, then Bristol Mental Hospital) and of the local Learning disability Hospitals of the Stoke Park Group and the Burden Neurological Institution. The museum has drawings and paintings by the accomplished artist Dennis Reed who painted images of life at Glenside during the 1950s. These painting are located in the chancel. The museum charges no entrance fee, but depends on donations from the public.

Exhibits include several early Electroconvulsive therapy (ECT) machines.

One of the most celebrated workers at the former Bristol Lunatic Asylum was the painter Stanley Spencer (later Sir Stanley Spencer RA CBE) who worked there in 1915–1916 as medical orderly in the Royal Army Medical Corps. During World War I the asylum was turned over to military use and renamed the Beaufort War Hospital. It had to accommodate some 1,460 wounded soldiers at any one time, usually more. A number of the patients were retained to perform menial duties. As is recounted in Paul Gough's book, Stanley Spencer: Journey to Burghclere Spencer had a difficult time in the hospital, leavened by moments of quiet reverie, as the painter wrote of his second day "I had to scrub out the Asylum Church. It was a splendid test of my feelings about this war. And I still feel the necessity of the war, & I have seen some sights, but not what one might expect. The lunatics are good workers & one persists in saluting us & always with the wrong hand. Another one thinks he is an electric battery... "

On 14 December 2009, on the 50th anniversary of Spencer's death the University of the West of England  who now own the hospital building  held a celebratory event to unveil a series of artwork and a blue plaque remembering the painter's time in the vast teeming metropolis of the Beaufort.

See also 
Healthcare in Bristol
Blackberry Hill Hospital
Churches in Bristol

References

External links 

 

Former churches in Bristol
Museums in Bristol
Hospital museums
Churches completed in 1861
Grade II listed buildings in Bristol
Grade II listed museum buildings
Grade II listed hospital buildings
University museums in England
Medical museums in England
Chapels in England
History of Bristol
1861 establishments in England